East Carroll Parish Detention Center is a parish jail in East Carroll Parish, Louisiana

Parish jails in Louisiana